Dominia is a Russian doom metal band formed in Saint Petersburg in 1999.

Members

Current members
Anton Rosa – vocals, bass
Denis "Daniel" Sukharev – guitar
Oleg"Papa" Philistovich – drums
Mikhail Morozkin – violin

Former members
Kat – violin
Alexander Goodwin – bass
Ilya "Pin" Kononov – bass
Oleg "Papa" Filistovich – drums
Pavel Lohnin – drums

Discography

Full length
2006 – Divine Revolution
2008 – Judgement of Tormented Souls
2014 – Theophania
2017 – Stabat Mater
2020 - The Withering of the Rose

Demos & singles
2001 – Dancing with Marie Jane (demo)
2002 – Cover Single (single)
2003 – Demo (demo),
2003 – God's Depression (demo)
2003 – Melancholy (demo)
2004 – Demo 2 (demo)
2005 – Runaway (single)
2005 – Divine Revolution (demo)
2006 – The Darkness of Bright Life (single)
2008 – Exodus (single)
2011 – Promo Pack (demo)
2013 – Death Only (single)
2015 – The Boy and the Priest (single)
2015 – Poison (single)
2016 – The First and the Last Prayer (single)
2022 – Homecoming (single)

External links
Official website
MySpace page
Page on UHO Production 
Russian fansite

Dominia
Dominia
Dominia
Musical quintets
1999 establishments in Russia